Cottingley may refer to:

Cottingley, Bradford, near Bingley, West Yorkshire, England
Cottingley Fairies, photographs taken in Cottingley, Bradford
Cottingley, Leeds, West Yorkshire, England
Cottingley railway station serves Cottingley, Leeds
Cottingley (novella), a 2017 novella by Alison Littlewood
The Cottingley Cuckoo, a 2021 novel by Alison Littlewood